Apibacter muscae is a bacterium from the genus of Apibacter which has been isolated from  house flys.

References

Flavobacteria
Bacteria described in 2019